Lars Elgersma (born 25 October 1983) is a Dutch speed skater, specialising in short and middle distances.

At the 2007 KNSB Dutch Single Distance Championships Elgersma finished fifth over 500 metres and eighth over 1000 metres, which gave him the opportunity to skate in several Speed Skating World Cup meetings throughout the season. He also represented his country at the 2007 Winter Universiade held in Turin where he won the bronze medal over 1000 metres.

References

1983 births
Living people
Medalists at the 2007 Winter Universiade
Dutch male speed skaters
People from Nieuwerkerk aan den IJssel
Speed skaters at the 2007 Winter Universiade
Universiade medalists in speed skating
Universiade bronze medalists for the Netherlands
Sportspeople from South Holland